Aurantiacibacter atlanticus  is a Gram-negative, rod-shaped and motile bacteria from the genus Aurantiacibacter which has been isolated from deep-sea sediments from the Atlantic Ocean. Erythrobacter atlanticus has the ability to degrade polycyclic aromatic hydrocarbons.

References

Further reading 
 

Sphingomonadales
Bacteria described in 2015